Pholadidae, known as piddocks or angelwings, are a family of bivalve molluscs similar to a clam.

Background
Piddocks are unique in that each side of their shells is divided into 2 or 3 separate sections. Furthermore, one of the piddock's shells has a set of ridges or "teeth", which they use to grind away at clay or soft rock and create tubular burrows. The shape of these burrows are due to the rotating motion of the piddock as it grinds the rock to make its home. The piddock stays in the burrow it digs for the entirety of its eight-year lifespan, with only its siphon exposed to take in water that it filters for food. When the piddock dies and leaves an empty tubular burrow, other marine life such as sea anemone, crabs and other molluscs may use the burrow.

Some species of Pholadidae may reach up to 18 cm (7″). Their coloration is typically white, though through consumption of red tide algae some may develop a pink coloration.

 The angelwing species Cyrtopleura costata has approximately 26 radiating ribs. Growth lines run horizontally over the surface of the shell. Angelwings have a spoon-shaped brace under the beak of the shell, called the apophysis, where the mollusc's foot muscles are attached. Cyrtopleura costata possesses long siphons which protrude from its burrow and circulate water as the source for its food supply. It cannot retract its siphons into the protection of its shell, so the two valves can never shut completely. The muscles fusing the shell's valves together are weak, making it rare to find angelwings with both halves still intact. Some shell hunters dig for the living clam, and if dug up, the fragile shell must be placed immediately into a container of water or it will close and shatter. The angelwing's shell is popular with collectors, as well as a delicious food staple. The angelwing lives offshore and in estuaries, sometimes as much as a metre (three feet) deep in the mud or clay.
 The Atlantic mud-piddock, Barnea truncata, often referred to as the fallen angelwing, is classed among the angelwing varieties, growing up to 5.7 cm (2¼″) and is similar to other angelwings but with weaker sculpture. One end is squared off and the other end pointed. Loose accessory plates are located above the hinge on live specimens. It possesses a white exterior and interior. It burrows into mud, clay or softwood. Occasionally it is washed onto sounds and ocean beaches, and has a habitat range from Nova Scotia to Brazil. This fragile shell is rarely dug from mud without breaking. It burrows deeply and has long, united siphons.
 The false angelwing Petricola pholadiformis, is also classed among varieties of angelwing, growing up to 7 cm (2¾″). It has a thin, elongate shell resembling a small angelwing but lacks the rolled-out hinge area. Its beak is at one end of the shell with strong radial ribbing on the beak end. Teeth are located on hinge and a deep pallial sinus and partially united siphons. It has a white exterior and interior. It typically burrows into hard surfaces such as clay or peat in intertidal zones. It is commonly found on sounds and ocean beaches with a range from Canada to Uruguay.
 The common piddock (Pholas dactylus) is known for its bioluminescence and was investigated by Raphaël Dubois in his 1887 discovery of luciferin.

Genera and selected species

 Genus Barnea Risso, 1826
 Barnea candida Linnaeus, 1758
 Barnea fragilis
 Barnea manilensis (Philippi, 1847)
 Barnea parva Pennant, 1777
 Barnea similis (Gray, 1835)
 Barnea subtruncata (G. B. Sowerby I, 1834)
 Barnea truncata (Say, 1822)
 Genus Chaceia Turner, 1855
 Chaceia ovoidea (Gould, 1851)
 Genus Cyrtopleura Tryon, 1862
 Cyrtopleura costata (Linnaeus, 1758)
 Genus Diplothyra Tryon, 1862
 Diplothyra smithii Tryon, 1862
 Genus Jouannetia Desmoulins, 1828
 Jouannetia quillingi Turner, 1955
 Genus Martesia G. B. Sowerby I, 1824
 Martesia cuneiformis (Say, 1822)
 Martesia fragilis A. E. Verrill and Bush, 1890
 Martesia striata (Linnaeus, 1758)
 Genus Netastoma Carpenter, 1864
 Netastoma japonicum (Yokoyama, 1920)
 Netastoma rostratum (Valenciennes, 1846)
 Genus Nettastomella Carpenter, 1865
 Nettastomella darwini (Sowerby, 1849)
 Genus Parapholas Conrad, 1848
 Parapholas californica (Conrad, 1837)
 Genus Penitella Valenciennes, 1846
 Penitella conradi Valenciennes, 1846
 Penitella fitchi Turner, 1955
 Penitella gabbii (Tryon, 1863)
 Penitella hopkinsi Kennedy and Armentrout, 1989
 Penitella kamakurensis (Yokoyama, 1922)
 Penitella penita (Conrad, 1837)
 Penitella richardsoni Kennedy, 1989
 Penitella turnerae Evans and Fisher, 1966
 Genus Pholadidea Turton, 1819
 Pholadidea acherontea Beu and Climo, 1974
 Pholadidea loscombiana Turton, 1819
 Pholadidea spathulata (Sowerby, 1850)
 Pholadidea tridens (Gray, 1843)
 Genus Pholas Linnaeus, 1758
 Pholas campechiensis Gmelin, 1791
 Pholas dactylus Linnaeus, 1758 – common piddock
 Genus Xylophaga Turton, 1822
 Xylophaga abyssorum Dall, 1886
 Xylophaga atlantica Richards, 1942
 Xylophaga dorsalis (Turton, 1819)
 Xylophaga praestans E. A. Smith, 1903
 Xylophaga washingtona Bartsch, 1921
 Genus Xyloredo Turner, 1972
 Xyloredo naceli Turner, 1972
 Xyloredo nooi Turner, 1972
 Genus Zirfaea Gray, 1842
 Zirfaea crispata (Linnaeus, 1758)
 Zirfaea pilsbryi Lowe, 1931

Gallery

See also
 Pholad borings

References

External links
 Angelwing
 Cyrtopleura costata Angelwing clams
 NC Sea Grant Seashells of NC Field Guide
 Angelwing, Cyrtopleura costata
 Cyrtopleura costata taxonomy
 ITIS
 

 
Bivalve families
Taxa named by Jean-Baptiste Lamarck